Al Yasmina Academy is a private, British curriculum school in Abu Dhabi, United Arab Emirates. Al-Yasmina educates students from foundation stage 1 till year 13 in joint primary and secondary schools.

History
Al Yasmina Academy was opened in September 2008 by Darren Gale, ex-principal and is being run by Aldar Academies.

Curriculum
Al Yasmina follows the British curriculum. The school offers iGCSEs, GCSEs and A-Levels. Science, English and mathematics are compulsory subjects throughout the school. Students begin their secondary school years in Key Stage 3 (Years 7, 8 and 9), following the National Curriculum of England and Wales, and then move into Key Stage 4 (Years 10 and 11). During KS4 they sit a range of UK national exams GCSE (General Certificate of Secondary Education) and IGCSE (International General Certificate of Secondary Education). If students achieve the required grades they can go on to an advanced level of study which is a prerequisite for university. This course is done in the last two years of school (which are non-compulsory) and are spent in Key Stage 5, which at Al Yasmina is known as Post-16.

Sports and Activities
Al Yasmina Academy is associated to the UAE touch Football programme. The school has already played a vital role in the increased presence of touch rugby in the Emirates having anchored the under-9 and under-11 Abu Dhabi Schools Super Touch Series.

Art and Theatre 
Al Yasmina Academy also hosts Art and Theatre courses, such as in Art, Drama, and Design & Technology, all of which are offered at both GCSE and A-Level qualifications. The current Head of Drama is teacher Nick Washbrook, who is also the Assistant Principal of Pastoral Welfare and Standards.

Al Yasmina regularly holds showings of Theatre/Drama performances done by students, and sometimes teachers. Recent performances include Annie (play), Grease (play), The Curious Incident of the Dog in the Night-Time (play), and the Joker (play), in which Nick Washbrook himself played the Joker and heckled and laughed at the audience.

Awards
The school won 'Best School' in the 2012 Ahlan! 'Best in Abu Dhabi' awards.

See also

 Al Salam Private School & Nursery

References

External links
 

Schools in the Emirate of Abu Dhabi
International schools in the United Arab Emirates
Private schools in the United Arab Emirates
Educational institutions established in 2008
2008 establishments in the United Arab Emirates